This is a list of recordings of Die Frau ohne Schatten, a three-act opera by Richard Strauss with a German-language libretto by Hugo von Hofmannsthal. The work was first performed in Vienna on 10 October 1919.

Recordings

References
Notes

Opera discographies
Operas by Richard Strauss